Ada Castells Ferrer or Ada Castells (born 1968) is a Catalan professor, writer and journalist.

Life
Castells was born in Barcelona in 1968.

Her first novel El dit de l'àngel involved her Protestant ancestors. It was published in Catalan (and Spanish) in 1998.

Castells was a Professor in 1999. In 2004, her novel about the German painter Caspar David Friedrich, "Tota La Vida", was published. In 2010 she had teaching obligations at two universities and other colleges.

Her 2012 book Pura Sang (Pure Blood) was set in Minorca and it won the 32nd Premi Sant Joan Unnim for Catalan literature. Her 2019 novel "Mare" involves the differing memories of a woman and her daughter.

References

External links 

 

1968 births
Living people
People from Barcelona
Spanish journalists
Spanish women journalists
21st-century Spanish writers
21st-century Spanish women writers